The Śūraṅgama Samādhi Sūtra (Sanskrit; ; Vietnamese: Kinh Thủ Lang Nghiêm Tam Muội) is an early Mahayana sutra of Indian origin which focuses on the transcendental nature, supernatural powers, and transformational feats bestowed upon the meditation practitioner by the state of meditation called the "Śūraṅgama Samādhi" or the "Samādhi of the Heroic Progression."

History
The Śūraṅgama Samādhi Sūtra was translated from the Sanskrit into Chinese by Kumārajīva probably between 402 and 409 C.E. and was later translated into Tibetan by Sakyaprabha and Ratnaraksita at the beginning of the 9th century.

Contents

The nature of the Buddha
Professor Lamotte describes the nature of the Buddha in this sutra as follows:

Powers of the Buddha
The sutra describes the 100 powers and abilities which the Buddha or 10th-level Bodhisattvas can perform, while operating from within this samādhi state.

Amongst the wonders which the Buddha can perform whilst in this state of Śūraṅgama Samādhi are:
 The projection or conjuration of 84,000 other Buddhas, identical replicas of himself and equally real 
 Complete purification of individual mind and ability to purify the mind of others
 Universal omniscience
 True knowledge regarding the mechanism of cause and effect without mental obstruction
 Knowledge regarding the dissipation of mental defilement, such as anger and lust
 Elimination of unnecessary mental activity and complete elimination of defilements
 Harmonious renunciation of worldly life
 Being able to access and understand different existential forms
 Being able to change sex at will without mental confusion
 Always knowing the right moral path to proceed
 Placing immense Buddha Paradises (universes) into a single pore of the skin
 Always presiding over the superknowledges (abhijna)
 Always emitting rays of light over all universes without exception
 Being able to speak and understand all languages of all universes
 Completely avoiding all evil paths
 Possessing a knowledge which is profound and unfathomable

Knowledge of the Dharmadhatu
Part of that profound and unfathomable knowledge is that all dharmas (things) have their basis in the dharma-dhatu - the element of phenomena. In this sense, there is non-duality that characterises everything, since everything is possessed of the 'one flavour' of the dharma-dhatu. The Buddha states:

Attributes of a Buddha
The Buddha remarks in the Śūraṅgama Samādhi Sūtra that any being who cultivates this samadhi will be able to know through pratyatmajnanam, "through personal experience," through knowing directly within oneself, all the attributes of a buddha.

Amongst those attributes is sovereignty over all humans and gods. The Buddha states of great bodhisattvas and buddhas who possess this samadhi:

A bodhisattva who is immersed in this samadhi also rises beyond birth and death. The Buddha comments:

Blessings
Even the writing down, studying and teaching of this Śūraṅgama Samādhi by a master of Dharma will bestow immense blessings, twenty in number. These include:

 Inconceivable knowledge and wisdom, 
 Inconceivable vision of all the buddhas, and 
 Inconceivable virtues and sovereign powers.

One of these powers is demonstrated by the future Buddha, Maitreya, who transforms himself into innumerable different types of leading spiritual personages in countless world-systems at the same time.

Commenting on the great qualities of those such as Maitreya who preside over the Śūraṅgama Samādhi, a whole host of great Bodhisattvas declare in the presence of the Buddha:

Mahāyāna Mahāparinirvāṇa Sūtra
This particular samadhi is equally praised in the Mahāyāna Mahāparinirvāṇa Sūtra, where the Buddha explains that this samadhi is the essence of the nature of the Buddha, and is indeed the "mother of all Buddhas."

The Buddha also comments that the Śūraṅgama Samādhi additionally goes under several other names, specifically:

 Prajñāpāramitā (Perfection of Wisdom)
 Vajra Samadhi (Diamond Samadhi)
 Simhanada Samadhi (Lion's Roar samadhi)
 Buddhasvabhava (Buddha essence).

References

Sources

 
 Harrison, Paul; McRae, John, trans. (1998). The Pratyutpanna Samādhi Sutra and the Śūraṅgama Samādhi Sutra, Berkeley, Calif.: Numata Center for Buddhist Translation and Research.

External links
 Śūraṃgamasamādhisūtra, The Concentration of Heroic Progress: An Early Mahayana Buddhist Scripture at the Internet Archive

Mahayana sutras